Nashville is a city in Kingman County, Kansas, United States.  As of the 2020 census, the population of the city was 54.

History
Nashville was founded about 1888, serving as a station on the Santa Fe Railway. It was named after Nashville, Tennessee.  The first post office at Nashville was established in August 1887. The independent newspaper, Nashville Journal was established in 1912 by its editor Clyde Walter, who left Nashville to enlist in the US Army during World War I.

Geography
Nashville is located at  (37.439320, -98.421898).

Demographics

In 1915, the estimated population was 200.

2010 census
As of the census of 2010, there were 64 people, 39 households, and 19 families living in the city. The racial makeup of the city was 98.4% White and 1.6% African American.

There were 39 households, of which 7.7% had children under the age of 18 living with them, 41.0% were married couples living together, 5.1% had a female householder with no husband present, 2.6% had a male householder with no wife present, and 51.3% were non-families. 46.2% of all households were made up of individuals, and 18% had someone living alone who was 65 years of age or older. The average household size was 1.64 and the average family size was 2.21.

The median age in the city was 55 years. 6.2% of residents were under the age of 18; 3.2% were between the ages of 18 and 24; 23.4% were from 25 to 44; 39.1% were from 45 to 64; and 28.1% were 65 years of age or older. The gender makeup of the city was 59.4% male and 40.6% female.

2000 census
As of the census of 2000, there were 111 people, 45 households, and 36 families living in the city. The racial makeup of the city was 97.30% White, 0.90% African American, 0.90% from other races, and 0.90% from two or more races. Hispanic or Latino of any race were 2.70% of the population.

There were 45 households, out of which 26.7% had children under the age of 18 living with them, 71.1% were married couples living together, 6.7% had a female householder with no husband present, and 20.0% were non-families. 20.0% of all households were made up of individuals, and 8.9% had someone living alone who was 65 years of age or older. The average household size was 2.47 and the average family size was 2.83.

In the city, the population was spread out, with 19.8% under the age of 18, 7.2% from 18 to 24, 27.9% from 25 to 44, 26.1% from 45 to 64, and 18.9% who were 65 years of age or older. The median age was 44 years. For every 100 females, there were 122.0 males. For every 100 females age 18 and over, there were 93.5 males.

The median income for a household in the city was $31,250, and the median income for a family was $33,750. Males had a median income of $26,875 versus $19,688 for females. The per capita income for the city was $15,613. There were 11.1% of families and 17.9% of the population living below the poverty line, including 50.0% of under eighteens and 3.7% of those over 64.

Education
The community is served by Cunningham–West Kingman County USD 332 public school district. The Cunningham High School mascot is Cunningham Wildcats.

Nashville and Zenda schools were unified as Nashville-Zenda schools in 1964. The Nashville-Zenda Thunderbirds won the Kansas State High School 8-Man football championship in 1969.

Notable people
 Ernest Schmidt (1911–1986), basketball college player, member of the Basketball Hall of Fame

References

Further reading

External links

 Nashville - Directory of Public Officials
 Nashville city map, KDOT

Cities in Kansas
Cities in Kingman County, Kansas